Beckley is a city in and the county seat of Raleigh County, West Virginia, United States. The population was 17,286 at the 2020 census. It is the principal city of the Beckley metropolitan area of Southern West Virginia, home to 115,079	residents in 2020. Beckley was founded on April 4, 1838, and was long known for its ties to the coal mining industry. It is the home of the West Virginia University Institute of Technology, as well as campuses of Concord University and the University of Charleston.

History

The area surrounding Beckley was long home to many indigenous peoples. Early encounters describe the land as being an ancestral home of the Catawba-speaking Moneton people, who referred to the surrounding area as Okahok Amai, and were allies of the Monacan people. The Moneton's Catawba speaking neighbors to the south, the Tutelo (since absorbed into the Seneca-Cayuga Nation) may have absorbed surviving Moneton communities, and claim the area as ancestral lands. Cherokee and Shawnee and Yuchi peoples also claim the area as included in their traditional lands. Waves of conflict and displacement connected to European settler-colonial conquest also resulted in varied communities finding home and refuge in southern West Virginia, becoming identified as Mingo — remote affiliates of the Iroquois Confederacy.

Beckley was named in honor of John James Beckley, who was the first Clerk of the House of Representatives and the first Librarian of Congress. It was founded by his son, Alfred Beckley (US Army lieutenant and brigadier general of Virginia militia), who was from the District of Columbia.

Although founded in 1838, Beckley existed only on paper at that time, "Alfred Beckley said he "was frequently jeered and laughed at for his Paper Town..." Early in its history, the town was known as Beckley, Raleigh Court House, and, occasionally, Beckleyville.

The town was originally located in Fayette County, Virginia. In 1850 the act of the Virginia legislature creating Raleigh County named Beckley the county seat.

The city is sometimes called the "Smokeless Coal Capital", "The City of Champions" and the "Gateway To Southern West Virginia."

During the presidential primaries of 1960, the vehicles of rivals John F. Kennedy and Hubert Humphrey stopped at the same streetcorner in Beckley. Recognizing each other, the two men got out and chatted briefly.

Geography

Geology and topography 
The city sits atop the Allegheny Plateau, with the more steeply eroded Logan Plateau bordering to the west and the highland Allegheny Mountains lying to the east. Neighboring ridgelines include Flat Top Mountain to the south, Scott Ridge of Shady Spring Mountain to the southeast, Batoff Mountain to the northeast, and Lilly Mountain to the west.

Water 
Beckley is mostly contained in the Piney Creek watershed, which flows into the New River National Park and Reserve. The city is roughly bordered by Piney Creek to the east, and to the south by its tributary Whitestick Creek. Cranberry Creek and its southern tributary Little Whitestick Creek flow through the northern part of the city. The northwestern corner of the city, around Tamarack, includes the headwaters of Paint Creek, another New River tributary. Neighboring watersheds include Glade Creek to the east, headwaters of the Coal River to the west, and headwaters of the Guyandotte River to the southwest.

Climate 
Due to its elevation, the climate of Beckley is humid subtropical (Köppen Cfa) bordering on both an oceanic (Köppen Cfb) and humid continental (Köppen Dfa/Dfb), and the city straddles the border between USDA Plant Hardiness Zones 6B and 7A. Summers are warm and humid, usually a few degrees cooler than lower-elevation places within the state, with an average of only 1.3 days of a maximum at or above  annually. On average, the first and last occurrences of freezing temperatures in the cooler season are October 13 and April 30, respectively, allowing for a growing season of 165 days.

Demographics

2010 census
As of the census of 2010, there were 17,614 people, 7,800 households, and 4,414 families living in the city. The racial makeup of the city was 72.3% White, 21.2% African American, 0.3% Native American, 2.4% Asian, 0.5% from other races, and 3.2% from two or more races. Hispanic or Latino of any race were 1.5% of the population.

There were 7,800 households, of which 25.6% had children under the age of 18 living with them, 36.8% were married couples living together, 15.5% had a female householder with no husband present, 4.2% had a male householder with no wife present, and 43.4% were non-families. 37.5% of all households were made up of individuals, and 15.4% had someone living alone who was 65 years of age or older. The average household size was 2.17 and the average family size was 2.85.

The median age in the city was 41.6 years. 20.2% of residents were under the age of 18; 9.5% were between the ages of 18 and 24; 23.9% were from 25 to 44; 28.5% were from 45 to 64; and 17.9% were 65 years of age or older. The gender makeup of the city was 46.6% male and 53.4% female.

2000 census
As of the census of 2000, there were 17,254 people, 7,651 households, and 4,590 families living in the city. The population density was 1,874.9 people per square mile (724.1/km2). There were 8,731 housing units at an average density of 948.8 per square mile (366.4/km2). The racial makeup of the city was 73.64% White, 22.89% African American, 0.14% Native American, 1.89% Asian, 0.02% Pacific Islander, 0.21% from other races, and 1.22% from two or more races. Hispanic or Latino of any race were 0.74% of the population.

There were 7,651 households, out of which 25.1% had children under the age of 18 living with them, 40.9% were married couples living together, 16.2% had a female householder with no husband present, and 40.0% were non-families. 35.6% of all households were made up of individuals, and 16.5% had someone living alone who was 65 years of age or older. The average household size was 2.18 and the average family size was 2.83.

In the city, the population was spread out, with 21.8% under the age of 18, 8.3% from 18 to 24, 25.3% from 25 to 44, 24.4% from 45 to 64, and 20.2% who were 65 years of age or older. The median age was 42 years. For every 100 females, there were 82.0 males. For every 100 females age 18 and over, there were 77.1 males.

The median income for a household in the city was $28,122, and the median income for a family was $38,110. Males had a median income of $35,780 versus $23,239 for females. The per capita income for the city was $18,912. About 16.4% of families and 20.9% of the population were below the poverty line, including 33.9% of those under age 18 and 9.5% of those age 65 or over.

Arts and culture
Notable sites include:

 The Beckley Exhibition Coal Mine, a preserved coal mine that offers daily tours and a history lesson on coal mining in Appalachia.
 Tamarack, a showcase of Appalachian arts and crafts built in 1996 at a cost of $10 million and dedicated to former Governor Gaston Caperton.
 The Youth Museum of Southern West Virginia, which includes a planetarium, boxcars and a homestead with a weaver's shed.

Education
Woodrow Wilson High School is Beckley's public high school.

Three universities are located in Beckley: West Virginia University Institute of Technology, University of Charleston-Beckley, and a branch campus of Concord University. Additionally, a branch campus of Valley College is located in Beckley; New River Community and Technical College is in the nearby community of Beaver; and the nonprofit, nondenominational Appalachian Bible College is located just outside the city limits, in nearby Bradley.

Infrastructure

Transportation
The city is the regional hub for over 100,000 Southern West Virginia residents. It is the ninth-largest city in West Virginia, exceeded in population by Martinsburg and followed by Clarksburg.

Highways

Rail
Amtrak serves Beckley at Prince Station in Prince as part of the Cardinal line running from Chicago to Washington DC.

Air
Greater Beckley's only airport is Raleigh County Memorial Airport. Raleigh County Memorial Airport is served by Contour Airlines with service to Charlotte and Parkersburg.

Media

Newspaper
The Register Herald

Radio
WVBY public radio translator
WJLS local commercial radio network

Television
West Virginia Public Broadcasting's WSWP
WVVA
WOAY
WVNS-TV

Notable people
 Rob Ashford, choreographer
 Jennifer Belcher, former member of the Washington State House of Representatives and first female Washington State Commissioner of Public Lands
 Mark Carman, Producer Songwriter, Musician
 Tom Carper, U.S. Senator from Delaware
 Barbara M. Clark, New York state legislator
 Cora Sue Collins, actress
 Little Jimmy Dickens, singer
 B. Kwaku Duren, American lawyer, educator, writer, editor
 Joe Goddard, professional baseball player
 Doug Legursky, professional football player
 Tom Maddox, author
 Jon McBride, astronaut
 Scott McClanahan, writer
 Stephen M. Pachuta, retired United States Navy admiral.
 Christa Pike, convicted murderer
 Bob Pruett, American football coach
 Nick Rahall, U.S. Representative
 Chris Sarandon, actor
 Art Simmons, musician
 Calvin Simon, musician
 Tamar Slay, basketball player for Sutor Basket Montegranaro, formerly with the New Jersey Nets
 Hulett C. Smith, Governor of West Virginia
 Morgan Spurlock, filmmaker
 Al Thompson, casino executive 
 Bill Withers, musician

References

External links
 City of Beckley Website

 
Cities in West Virginia
Cities in Raleigh County, West Virginia
County seats in West Virginia
Mining communities in West Virginia
Micropolitan areas of West Virginia
Populated places established in 1838
Coal towns in West Virginia
1838 establishments in Virginia